Susolovka is a rural locality (a settlement) and the administrative center of Susolovskoye Rural Settlement, Velikoustyugsky District, Vologda Oblast, Russia. The population was 910 as of 2002. There are 22 streets.

Geography 
Susolovka is located 72 km east of Veliky Ustyug (the district's administrative centre) by road. Severny is the nearest rural locality.

References 

Rural localities in Velikoustyugsky District